Mika Tauriainen (born 5 January 1975 Sweden) is a Finnish vocalist. He is currently a member of gothic metal band Entwine, Frostlit and ex-vocalist of atmospheric rock band ShamRain.

Discography
With Entwine
 Chaotic Nation (2015/Spinefarm Records)
 Rough n' Stripped (2009/Spinefarm Records)
 Painstained (2009/Spinefarm Records)
 Fatal Design (2006/Spinefarm Records)
 Sliver EP (2005/Spinefarm Records)
 DiEversity (2004/Spinefarm Records)
 Time of Despair (2002/Spinefarm Records)
 Gone (2001/Spinefarm Records)

Singles With Entwine
 Plastic World (2015)
 Strife (2009)
 Surrender (2005)
 Break Me (2005)
 Bitter Sweet (2004)
 New Dawn (2000)

With ShamRain

 Goodbye To All That (2007)
 Deeper Into The Night (MCD) (2006)
 Someplace Else (2005)
 ShamRain EP (2004)
 Empty World Excursion (2003)
 Pieces (MCD) (2002)

Guest appearances
2006: feat. Michelle Darkness the song "Hatethings" from the Album Brand new Drug.
 2007: Male vocals on the songs "Emotional Man" and "Only for the stars in your eyes" from the album "Salomé - The Seventh Veil" by Xandria
 2009: Male Vocals on the song "Kuoleman Suudelma" from the album Julma Satu by Villieläin.
2010: with Herrasmiesliiga on the song "Herrasmiesliiga" from the Album Jare Henrik Tiihonen

References

External links
 Discogs Profile
 ENTWINE (MIKA TAURIAINEN) *Interview* Face to Face
 Metalglory Profile
 To hell with comparisons! *Interview*

1975 births
Living people
People from Motala Municipality
21st-century Finnish male singers